Turtles are a candy made with pecans and caramel dipped in chocolate, with a shape resembling a turtle. The name is trademarked by DeMet's Candy Company.  In Canada they are sold under the Nestle brand name.

History
Turtles were developed in 1918 by Johnson’s Candy Company (which became DeMet’s Candy Company in 1923), after a salesman came into the commissary’s dipping room and showed a candy to one of the dippers, who pointed out that the candy looked like a turtle. Soon after, Johnson’s Candy Company was making the same kind of candy and selling it under the name "Turtles."

Today, Turtles candies come in all sizes, shapes and recipes, some even shaped like a turtle, with modern mold-making techniques, but the originals were produced by candy dippers on a rectangular marble 'board', similar in size to a contemporary kitchen cutting board. The original recipe, as executed on marble, was pecans, caramel and various chocolates; they were a multi-task confection, requiring several sittings.

Trademark 

Pecans dipped in chocolate were commonly made in the early 1900s, however, Johnson's Candy Company first protected the trademark "Turtles." In 1923, the stores dropped the Johnson name and assumed the name DeMet's, passing along the trademark.

Nestle owned the brand in the USA for a time, but sold it to Brynwood Partners' DeMet's Candy Company in 2007. In 2013, Brynwood sold the company to Yıldız Holding.

Canadian Market 
In Canada the products are still distributed and sold as a Nestle product; promoted as "a cherished Canadian tradition since 1949".  A popular Christmas product that's sold by most major retailers most notably during the holiday season. The Canadian packaging features Mr. Turtle, a mascot of an anthropomorphic turtle wearing a tuxedo, a top hat, and a monocle. The candy is manufactured in Toronto for the domestic market.

In popular culture
 The turtles are the favorite sweets of Rochelle Rock in the 1980s-period sitcom  Everybody Hates Chris. The character appeared eating them in several episodes and even had a withdrawal crisis when she had to stop eating them for a short time.
 One episode of Hey Arnold, Chocolate Turtles has a focus on it.
In the Season 4 Episode of The Office (American TV Series) called “Dunder Mifflin Infinity”, chocolate turtles feature prominently. Michael gives gift baskets to former clients in an effort to win their business back. When he realizes he is unsuccessful, he takes back one of the baskets and is furious to find that the turtles were already eaten, leading to the popular line “Where are the turtles????”.

References

External links 
 Canadian website (Nestlé)
 U.S. website (DeMets)

Brand name confectionery
Canadian confectionery
Chocolate bars
Chocolate-covered foods
Nestlé brands